Nadya Ginsburg is an American actress, comedian and television writer. She is best known as a cast member on the sketch comedy show Hype, her recurring role on the show Partners and for her online comedy videos where she appears as Cher and Madonna, most notably the web series "The Madonnalogues".

Career 

Ginsburg's first high profile gig was as a cast member on the short-lived variety sketch TV show Hype, created and written by Madtv writer Scott King. In 2010 she created a parody song and video of the Lady Gaga hit Poker Face with re-written lyrics about meteorologist Al Roker, and it went viral. She subsequently appeared on Good Morning America and was interviewed by Roker. The national attention revitalised interest in a 2007 web series Ginsburg starred in called The Worm, in which she portrayed an alien being that impersonated Madonna, Cher, Winona Ryder and others.

Ginsburg's parody impersonation of Madonna spun into a live show called The Madonnalogues, which in turn became an 8 episode web series by the same name. She also co-wrote and starred in the short film If We Took a Holiday, in which she portrays an actress whose best friend requests that she pretend to be Madonna and accompany him for the whole of his birthday.

Ginsburg was a writer on the Joan Rivers show Fashion Police for two years. She left the show as part of a writer's strike contesting that Rivers refused to pay fair wages or provide health insurance to the writing team.

Filmography

Film

Television

References

External links

 

Year of birth missing (living people)
Living people
American film actresses
American television actresses
21st-century American actresses